is a Japanese Grand Prix motorcycle racer, competing in Moto3 for Leopard Racing.

Career

Moto3 World Championship

Mahindra CIP (2015)
Suzuki made his Grand Prix debut in the 2015 Moto3 World Championship with CIP, riding a Mahindra alongside Remy Gardner. He achieved his best result at Silverstone with a 10th place and he got another point scoring finish in his home race with a 13th place, scoring a total of 9 points that season. Gardner only scored 6.

CIP-Unicom Starker (2016)
Suzuki remained with the same team for the 2016 Moto3 World Championship, but this time partnered by Fabio Spiranelli. Suziki obtained seven point scoring finishes, with a best result of 11th at Sachsenring, finishing the season with 16 points: his teammate Spiranelli ended with 0 points.

Sic58 Squadra Corse (2017–2021)
For the 2017 season, Suzuki left CIP Mahindra, and joined Sic58 Squadra Corse, riding alongside Tony Arbolino. This would be Suzuki's best season yet, finishing in the points scoring positions constantly, amassing 71 points, with a season's best result of 4th in his home Grand Prix of Motegi. Arbolino finished the season with 2 points.

Sticking with Sic58 Squadra Corse for the 2018 season, Suzuki was partnered by Niccolò Antonelli. The two riders both finished with 71 points, and a season high finish of 4th, Suzuki in Australia, Antonelli in Qatar.

The pair was kept for the 2019 season, and as it turned out, it proved to be a very good choice, as both drivers excelled. Suzuki had the best season of his career, winning the race in San Marino from Pole Position, and finishing second in Jerez, behind teammate Antonelli who won the race, earning Sic58 Squadra Corse their history's first 1–2. Suzuki finished the year with 124 points, 8th in the championship.

For the third consecutive year, Sic58 Squadra Corse went with Suzuki and Antonelli as its lineup, and Suzuki achieved similar success in the 2020 season as he did in 2019. He won the second race in Jerez, and finished third in San Marino, ending the year with 83 points and 12th in the championship. Antonelli however struggled, scoring no podiums, and only 40 points throughout the season.

In Suzuki's seventh season in Moto3, he failed to replicate his prior two seasons, finishing the 2021 season with no podiums, and 76 points, enough for 14th overall. Following Antonelli's poor season prior, he had a new teammate in Lorenzo Fellon, who was the only full time rider to not score a single point during the season.

Leopard Racing (2022–present)
Staying in the category for an eighth season, Suzuki is set to ride for Leopard Racing Team in 2022, partnering 2021 championship runner-up Dennis Foggia.

Career statistics

Grand Prix motorcycle racing

By season

By class

Races by year
(key) (Races in bold indicate pole position, races in italics indicate fastest lap)

References

External links

1997 births
Living people
Japanese motorcycle racers
Moto3 World Championship riders
People from Chiba (city)